Ivar Genesjö (24 January 1931 – 15 July 2020) was a Swedish fencer. He competed in the team épée event at the 1964 Summer Olympics.

References

External links
 

1931 births
2020 deaths
Swedish male épée fencers
Olympic fencers of Sweden
Fencers at the 1964 Summer Olympics
20th-century Swedish people